The C. E. Thompson General Store and House is a historic property at 3100 Hollywood Road (at the junction of Highways 26 and 8) in Arkadelphia, Arkansas.  Its principal structure is a single-story wood-frame with a gable roof, which was built in 1936 and served as a residence for the Thompson family and as a general store until it closed in the 1980s.  It is the only Craftsman-style general store building in Arkadelphia. The building currently houses Allen's Barbeque, a local barbeque restaurant.  
The property includes other historically significant buildings, including a garage, wellhouse, privy, shed, smokehouse, and barn.

The property was listed on the National Register of Historic Places in 2001.

See also
National Register of Historic Places listings in Clark County, Arkansas

References

Commercial buildings on the National Register of Historic Places in Arkansas
Buildings and structures completed in 1936
Buildings and structures in Arkadelphia, Arkansas
National Register of Historic Places in Clark County, Arkansas